Chinese Taipei competed at the 2020 Winter Youth Olympics in Lausanne, Switzerland from 9 to 22 January 2020.

Medalists
Medals awarded to participants of mixed-NOC teams are represented in italics. These medals are not counted towards the individual NOC medal tally.

Alpine skiing

Girls

Bobsleigh

Ice hockey

Mixed NOC 3x3 tournament 

Boys
Chen Chih-yuan
Lin Wei-yu

Girls
Chang En-ni
Huang Chun-lin
Kao Wei-ting

Luge

Boys

Short track speed skating

Boys

Girls

Mixed NOC team relay

Skeleton

See also
Chinese Taipei at the 2020 Summer Olympics

References

2020 in Taiwanese sport
Nations at the 2020 Winter Youth Olympics
Chinese Taipei at the Youth Olympics